This article is about the particular significance of the year 1888 to Wales and its people.

Incumbents

Lord Lieutenant of Anglesey – Richard Davies 
Lord Lieutenant of Brecknockshire – Joseph Bailey, 1st Baron Glanusk
Lord Lieutenant of Caernarvonshire – John Ernest Greaves
Lord Lieutenant of Cardiganshire – Edward Pryse (until 29 May); Herbert Davies-Evans (from 16 July)
Lord Lieutenant of Carmarthenshire – John Campbell, 2nd Earl Cawdor
Lord Lieutenant of Denbighshire – William Cornwallis-West    
Lord Lieutenant of Flintshire – Hugh Robert Hughes 
Lord Lieutenant of Glamorgan – Christopher Rice Mansel Talbot 
Lord Lieutenant of Merionethshire – Robert Davies Pryce
Lord Lieutenant of Monmouthshire – Henry Somerset, 8th Duke of Beaufort
Lord Lieutenant of Montgomeryshire – Edward Herbert, 3rd Earl of Powis
Lord Lieutenant of Pembrokeshire – William Edwardes, 4th Baron Kensington
Lord Lieutenant of Radnorshire – Arthur Walsh, 2nd Baron Ormathwaite

Bishop of Bangor – James Colquhoun Campbell 
Bishop of Llandaff – Richard Lewis
Bishop of St Asaph – Joshua Hughes
Bishop of St Davids – Basil Jones

Archdruid of the National Eisteddfod of Wales – Clwydfardd

Events
January – Plans are presented for a Welsh Presbyterian Chapel in Charing Cross Road, London.
March – Construction work begins on the Dowlais steelworks at East Moors, Cardiff.
11 April - Earthquake centred on Corwen.
May – Owen Glynne Jones climbs Cadair Idris by the east ridge of the Cyfrwy.
13 May – The young Beatrix Potter records a trip to Machynlleth in her diary.
14 May – Five miners are killed in an accident at the Aber Colliery, Porth, Rhondda.
August – Joshua Hughes, Bishop of St Asaph, has a seizure while staying in Scotland, and is paralysed until his death a few months later.
27 September – A new dock at Milford Haven is opened.
5 October – Five sailors are drowned at Colwyn Bay while returning to their ship by boat.
date unknown
University of Wales, Bangor, opens its agriculture department – the first in a British university.
The Welsh Parliamentary Liberal Party is formed.
Henry Morton Stanley "discovers" Lake Edward and names it after the Prince of Wales.
R. J. Lloyd Price opens a whisky distillery at Frongoch.
The remains of Llantwit Major Roman Villa are discovered.

Arts and literature

Awards
National Eisteddfod of Wales  – held at Wrexham
Chair – Thomas Tudno Jones, "Peroriaeth"
Crown – Howell Elvet Lewis, "Y Sabath yng Nghymru"

New books
Daniel Owen – Y Siswrn
J. Rhys – Lectures of the Origin and Growth of Religion as Illustrated by Celtic

Music
William Griffith – "I Will Extol Thee"

Sport
Cricket – Glamorgan County Cricket Club founded.
Golf – Tenby Links becomes the first golf course in Wales. The first competition held by the club is held on 25 October over 9 holes and is won by Mr T A Rees.
Rugby union
Briton Ferry RFC, Builth Wells RFC, Llantrisant RFC, Newbridge RFC and Tonna RFC are founded.
Willie Thomas is the only Welsh international to take part in the first overseas tour by a British rugby union team.
Wales win their first international game against Scotland, during the 1888 Home Nations Championship.
Wales face their first international opposition, the New Zealand Native football team. Wales win by a goal to nil.

Births
February – Grace Wynne Griffith, novelist (died 1963)
23 March – Fred Hando, writer and artist (died 1970)
29 April – Fred Dyer, boxer and baritone singer (died after 1934)
14 May – Nansi Richards, harpist (died 1979)
21 May – William Cove, politician (died 1963)
24 May – Howell Lewis, Wales international rugby player (died 1971)
18 June – Margaret Lindsay Williams, artist (died 1960)
16 August – T. E. Lawrence, writer and war hero (died 1935)
24 August – Valentine Baker, pilot and war hero (died 1942)
5 September – Rhys Hopkin Morris, politician (died 1956)
7 October – Frances Stevenson, secretary and later wife of David Lloyd George (died 1972)
19 October – Peter Freeman, politician (died 1956)
27 November – Ezer Griffiths, physicist (died 1962)
29 December – Reg Plummer, Wales and British Lion rugby union player (died 1953)

Deaths
23 February – Evan Davies (Myfyr Morganwg), poet and archdruid, 87
29 February – Thomas Price, Baptist minister and author, 67
7 March – Hugh Hughes (Cadfan), Patagonian colonist, 63
16 March – Thomas Thomas, chapel architect and minister, c. 81
22 March – Henry Robertson, Scottish engineer and founder of Brymbo Steel Works, 72
24 March – Benjamin Piercy, civil engineer, 61
29 May – Edward Pryse, politician, 70
7 June – Charles William Nevill, industrialist and politician, 72
2 August – David Davies (Dewi Emlyn), poet, 70
5 August – Charles Octavius Swinnerton Morgan, politician, historian and antiquary, 84
20 August – Henry Richard, politician and peace campaigner, 76
3 September – Robert H. Roberts, Welsh-born US senator, 51 (boatyard accident)
20 September – Elias Owen, footballer, 35 (suicide)
23 November – Edward John Sartoris, politician, 74/75
date unknown
John Evans (Y Bardd Cocos), poet
Morgan Morgans, mining engineer, 73/4

References

 
Wales